is a Japanese light novel series written by Kiichi Kosuzu and illustrated by Shiso (first volume) and Kihiro Yuzuki (from second volume). It began serialization online in December 2018 on the user-generated novel publishing website Shōsetsuka ni Narō. It was later acquired by Futabasha, who have published five volumes since July 2019 under their M Novels imprint. They later republished the series with Yuunagi as the new illustrator since July 2022 under their Monster Bunko label. A manga adaptation with art by Toshinori Okazaki has been serialized online via Futabasha's Gaugau Monster website since May 2020. It has been collected in six tankōbon volumes. An anime television series adaptation by Studio Blanc premiered in January 2023.

Characters

A powerful exorcist reborn into a world of magic. As his spirit is not native to it, he lacks any magical power. Instead, he uses talismans and jutsu to manipulate the six elements- Water, Fire, Earth, Air, Light and Shadow- and spells/curses leaving everyone confused because they have no concept of his mystical techniques.

A weasel demon Seika sealed in his past life; for an unknown reason, her human form is now a little girl. Yuki could recognize Seika as her master due to his soul.

Media

Light novel
The series written by Kiichi Kosuzu began serialization online in December 2018 on the user-generated novel publishing website Shōsetsuka ni Narō. It was later acquired by Futabasha, who have published the series as a light novel with illustrations by Shiso (first volume) and Kihiro Yuzuki (from second volume) in five volumes since July 31, 2019 under their M Novels imprint. Futabasha republished the series with Yuunagi as the new illustrator since July 2022 under its Monster Bunko label.

Manga
A manga adaptation with art by Toshinori Okazaki has been serialized online via Futabasha's Gaugau Monster website since May 2020. It has been collected in six tankōbon volumes.

Anime
On January 29, 2022, an anime adaptation was announced. It was later revealed to be a television series produced by Studio Blanc and directed by Ryōsuke Shibuya, with Nobuyoshi Nagayama serving as chief director, scripts written by Touko Machida, character designs handled by Masayoshi Kikuchi and Sayaka Ueno, and music composed by Alisa Okehazama. The series premiered on January 7, 2023, on AT-X and other networks. Crunchyroll has licensed the series.

Reception
The series has one million copies in circulation as of December 2022.

Notes

References

External links
 at Shōsetsuka ni Narō 
 
 

2019 Japanese novels
2023 anime television series debuts
Anime and manga based on light novels
AT-X (TV network) original programming
Crunchyroll anime
Fiction about reincarnation
Futabasha manga
Isekai anime and manga
Isekai novels and light novels
Japanese webcomics
Light novels
Light novels first published online
Seinen manga
Shōsetsuka ni Narō
Studio Blanc
Webcomics in print